Mali Vrh may refer to several places in Slovenia: 

Mali Vrh, Brežice, a settlement in the Municipality of Brežice
Mali Vrh, Dobrova–Polhov Gradec, a hamlet of Setnik in the Municipality of Dobrova–Polhov Gradec
Mali Vrh, Mirna Peč, a settlement in the Municipality of Mirna Peč
Mali Vrh pri Prežganju, a settlement in the City Municipality of Ljubljana
Mali Vrh pri Šmarju, a settlement in the Municipality of Grosuplje
Mali Vrh, Šmartno ob Paki, a settlement in the Municipality of Šmartno ob Paki
Mali Vrh, Sveta Ana, a hamlet of Kremberk in the Municipality of Sveta Ana